Grand Hotel Tremezzo is a historic luxury hotel located on the shores of Lake Como in Italy.

History 
The hotel was built on behalf of Enea Gandola on the grounds that previously belonged to Villa Poncetta. Gandola, who was from nearby Bellagio, had bought the land in 1907 with the purpose to build a new luxury hotel to meet Tremezzo's increasing tourism development. Construction works started in 1908 and were completed in 1910.

Description 
The building, located in the village of Tremezzo, features an Art Nouveau style.

Gallery

References

External links

Tremezzina
Hotels in Italy